The S1850M is a long-range radar with a digital antenna array for wide area search in elevation. The S1850M is manufactured by Thales and BAE Systems Integrated System Technologies (formerly AMS UK). It is a modified version of the Thales Nederland SMART-L radar. It is also claimed to be highly capable of detecting stealth targets, and able to detect and track outer atmosphere objects at short range, enabling it to form part of a Theatre Ballistic Missile Defence system.

The contract for initial production of the S1850M was signed in 2001: two for the UK, one for France, and one for Italy, with a common prototype based in Toulon. In 2005, a follow-on contract was signed for five more for the UK, one more for France, and one more for Italy.

A further developed version of the Smart-L is being installed on ships by the Royal Netherlands Navy, which is an updated version of the current SMART-L radar called the SMART-L-EWC (Early Warning Capability) Radar. It has a greater search radius: a tracking range of 2000 km for ballistic missiles and 480 km for air targets. SMART-L EWC is a programmable AESA radar that is characterized by full flexibility. Additional capabilities can be introduced during its lifetime according to customer needs. This makes the radar future-proof in case of evolving requirements.

Applications
 UK Royal Navy: Type 45 destroyer and 
 France: 
 Italy: Orizzonte-class destroyer

In all its current applications, the S1850M is the long-range radar (LRR) component of the Principal Anti-Air Missile System. On the Type 45 destroyers, it is paired with the SAMPSON multifunction radar; on the Horizon ships, it is paired with the EMPAR multifunction radar.

On 11 February 2009, Thales indicated that the S1850M radar will be fitted on the Royal Navy's Queen Elizabeth-class aircraft carrier.

References

External links
BAE article
Thales SMART-L-EWC
Royal Netherlands Navy signs agreement to upgrade 4 existing SMART-L radars with Early Warning Capability

Naval radars
Military radars of the United Kingdom
Military radars of France
Royal Navy Radar
Phased array radar
Military equipment introduced in the 2000s